Yong Ju Gol (also spelled Yongjugol, Yongju-gol, and Yongju-Gol) is a red-light district in Paju, Gyeonggi Province, South Korea. Yong Ju Gol began as a village that came into being during the Korean War to service members of the United States Army stationed at a nearby military camp whose spending was the sole source of revenue for the village. The military camp, Camp Ross, was just south of Yong Ju Gol and separated the village from Seoul. Once the post-war repatriation of prisoners concluded and until 1955, the 24th Military Police Company (seemingly the divisional MP company of the 24th Infantry Division) worked with other United Nations Command military police in Yong Ju Gol to keep law and order in the area. In 1966, a museum dedicated to the 2nd Infantry Division was opened near Yong Ju Gol, having been relocated there from Fort Benning, Georgia, but the museum was moved to Camp Casey five years later. In 1980, American soldier Freddie Grant attacked another American soldier with a straight razor outside a Yong Ju Gol nightclub and was subsequently imprisoned in the United States Disciplinary Barracks. Although it is illegal to engage in prostitution in South Korea, women continue to engage in sex work in Yong Ju Gol through massage parlors, karaoke bars, and kissing rooms. In 2006, South Korea's Minister of Gender Equality and Family, Jang Ha-jin, called Yong Ju Gol "the heart of prostitution" in Korea. A popular manhwa called Yongjugol Blues glamorizes the prostitution in the area.

References

Red-light districts in South Korea
Paju
Aftermath of the Korean War
Women in war in East Asia
Women in warfare post-1945